Eve Jardine-Young DL is the Principal of the Cheltenham Ladies' College.

Early life
She lived in Malawi, Central Africa, and was educated there at Saint Andrews International High School until 1989, when she accepted a scholarship to the Cheltenham Ladies' College for Sixth Form. After she left school, she studied Engineering Science at Pembroke College, Cambridge.

Career
Having worked in industry for a little while, she then entered the teaching profession, beginning at Radley College in Oxford, later moving to Epsom College in Surrey where she taught Economics. In 2005, she moved to Blundell's School in Devon, where she was Director of Studies for six years. She became Principal of Cheltenham Ladies' College in 2010.

Jardine-Young, concerned about stress levels in the students at Cheltenham Ladies' College, advocated the abolition of homework in 2015.

She was appointed as one of the Deputy Lieutenants of Gloucestershire in 2017.

References

Living people
Year of birth missing (living people)
Heads of schools in England
Place of birth missing (living people)
Alumni of Pembroke College, Cambridge
Deputy Lieutenants of Gloucestershire
Cheltenham Ladies' College faculty
Alumni of Saint Andrews International High School